Typographical symbols and punctuation marks are marks and symbols used in typography with a variety of purposes such as to help with legibility and accessibility, or to identify special cases. This list gives those most commonly encountered with Latin script. For a far more comprehensive list of symbols and signs, see List of Unicode characters. For other languages and symbol sets (especially accents), see below

In this table, 

 The first cell in each row gives a symbol; 
 The second, a link to the article that details it, using its Unicode standard name or common alias (holding the mouse pointer on the hyperlink will pop up a summary of the symbol's function); 
 The third, symbols listed elsewhere in the table that is similar to it in meaning or appearance or that may be confused with it; 
 The fourth (if present) links to related article(s) or adds a clarification note.

See also

 
  
 
 
 
 
 
 
 
  (used of the style 1st, 2nd, 3rd, 4th or as superscript).

Lists of other typographic entities
 List of currency symbols currently in use
 List of logic symbols
 List of Japanese typographic symbols
 List of mathematical symbols by subject
 List of common physics notations
 List of typographic features

Notes

External links
 The Comprehensive LaTeX Symbol List

 
Typographical symbols